Kosuke Mashiyama (born 9 March 1999) is a Japanese judoka.

He won a medal at the 2021 World Judo Championships.

References

External links
 

1999 births
Living people
Japanese male judoka
World judo champions
21st-century Japanese people